Vegelahn v. Guntner, 167 Mass. 92 (1896) is a United States labor law decision from the Supreme Judicial Court of Massachusetts. It is noted for its famous dissent, written by Oliver Wendell Holmes, Jr., rather than its majority opinion.

Facts
The union had picketed in front of the employer's business with the object of persuading current employees and job applicants to not enter the building.  The union also picketed to pressure workers to break employment contracts with the company. The objective was to force higher wages. The company successfully sought an injunction in court, under the doctrine of intentional interference with contract, alleging that the union was tortiously interfering with the relations between management and worker. In this era employers frequently resorted to state and federal courts to get restraining orders and injunctions to stop picketing, strikes, and boycotts.

Judgment
On appeal from the trial court, Justice Allen held that the coercion and intimidation found to have occurred interfered with the right of an employer to hire whom it pleases, and the right of workers to enter into employment.  The court ruled that the union was guilty of an intentional tort.

Justice Holmes disagreed, equating the use of collective force by workers to the corporate use of force to compete.

This was one of the first occasions when any judge of prominence had made such a declaration.

Significance
The Vegelahn case was decided in 1896, when immigration was steadily increasing and union membership was also increasing. The public had witnessed violent and far-flung labor unrest: with the Pullman Strike, the Homestead, Pennsylvania violence between steel workers and Carnegie Steel, and the Haymarket riot in Chicago. It would be another twenty-five years before the law would catch up to Holmes's dissent, with the passage of the federal Anti-Injunction Act (Norris-LaGuardia Act).

Notes

References

Massachusetts state case law
1896 in United States case law
1896 in Massachusetts
United States labor case law
Law articles needing an infobox